Foel Hafod-fynydd is a subsidiary summit of Aran Fawddwy in southern Snowdonia, North Wales, Wales, United Kingdom. It tops the east ridge of Erw y Ddafad-ddu. Creiglyn Dyfi nestles in the bowl between Foel Hafod-fynydd and Aran Fawddwy.

The summit is grassy marked by a few stones. Esgeiriau Gwynion lies to the north, Llechwedd Du to the east, and Gwaun Lydan to the south.

References

External links
www.geograph.co.uk : photos of Aran Fawddwy and surrounding area

Llanuwchllyn
Mawddwy
Mountains and hills of Gwynedd
Mountains and hills of Snowdonia
Hewitts of Wales
Nuttalls